Red Rocks Amphitheatre (also colloquially as simply Red Rocks) is an open-air amphitheatre built into a rock structure in the western United States, near Morrison, Colorado,  west of Denver. There is a large, tilted, disc-shaped rock behind the stage, a huge vertical rock angled outwards from stage right, several large outcrops angled outwards from stage left and a seating area for up to 9,525.

In 1927, the City of Denver purchased the area of Red Rocks; construction of the amphitheater began in 1936, and was opened to the public in June 1941. Since then, many notable performances and recordings for film and television have taken place there. In June 2015, the Colorado Music Hall of Fame opened in the Trading Post at Red Rocks.

The amphitheater is owned and operated by the City and County of Denver and is located in Red Rocks Park, part of the Denver Mountain Parks. The audience faces east-northeast, toward southern Denver, with the skyline of downtown visible to the left.

In 1957, the American Institute of Architects selected Red Rocks to be Colorado's entry at the National Gallery of Art for the AIA's Centennial Exhibition.

In 1999, after Pollstar magazine awarded Red Rocks the annual honor of being the best small outdoor venue for the eleventh time, the magazine changed the name of the award to the Red Rocks Award and removed Red Rocks from the running.

Construction began in October 2020 to replace the existing stage roof and structure.

History 
In the first decade of the twentieth century, John Brisben Walker had a vision of artists performing on a stage nestled in the perfectly acoustic surroundings of Red Rocks, which likely were used by the Ute tribe in earlier times. Walker produced several concerts between 1906 and 1910 on a temporary platform, and from his dream, the history of Red Rocks as an entertainment venue began. It took the natural amphitheater of Red Rocks over 200 million years to form. In addition to the platform, Walker also built the Mount Morrison Cable Incline funicular railway which carried tourists from a base at what is today the parking lot of the amphitheatre up to enjoy the view from the top of Mount Morrison. The incline operated for about five years beginning in 1909.

Geologically, the rocks surrounding the amphitheater are representative of the Fountain Formation. Originally, the place was known as the "Garden of the Angels" (1870s–1906) and then as the "Garden of the Titans" during the Walker years (1906–1928). The park, however, had always been known by the folk name "Red Rocks," which became its formal name when Denver acquired it in 1928. The amphitheater's rocks are named "Creation Rock" on the north, "Ship Rock" on the south, and "Stage Rock" to the east. Red Rocks Amphitheatre was designed by Denver architect Burnham Hoyt; and Stanley E. Morse. It's walls contain records dating back to the Jurassic period of 160 million years ago, as nearby dinosaur tracks have been discovered as well as fossil fragments of a  Plesiosaur. Red sandstone from Lyons, Colorado, similar in texture and color to the Red Rocks sandstone, was used to construct seating, the stage, and other structural necessities. 

In 1927, George Cranmer, Manager of Denver Parks, convinced the City of Denver to purchase the area of Red Rocks from Walker for $54,133 ($ today). Cranmer convinced Mayor Benjamin Stapleton to build on the foundation laid by Walker. By enlisting the help of the Civilian Conservation Corps (CCC) and the Works Progress Administration (WPA), labor and materials were provided for the venture. Construction of the amphitheater began in 1936, took five years to complete, and was formally dedicated on June 15, 1941.

Notable performances 

Public, organizational and private performances have been held at Red Rocks for over a century. The earliest documented performance at the amphitheater was the Grand Opening of the Garden of the Titans, put on by publisher John Brisben Walker on May 31, 1906. Featuring Pietro Satriano and his 25-piece brass band, it was the formal opening of the natural amphitheater for use by the general public after Walker purchased it with the proceeds of his sale of Cosmopolitan Magazine.

The amphitheater's largest-scale performance to date was the Feast of Lanterns on September 5, 1908. Commemorating the opening of the scenic road up nearby Mt. Falcon, it was patterned after the festival of Nagasaki, Japan, and featured four military bands and fireworks off Mt. Falcon, Mt. Morrison and two intermediate hills.

Renowned opera singer Mary Garden put Red Rocks on the world musical map with her performance on May 10, 1911. Having performed at many opera halls around the world, she pronounced Red Rocks the finest venue at which she had ever performed.

Upon the full construction of the amphitheatre to its present form by the Civilian Conservation Corps, the venue was formally dedicated on June 15, 1941. It has held regular concert seasons almost every year since 1947. It was shut down temporarily for COVID.

The first performance of each season is the Easter Sunrise Service, a nondenominational service held on Easter Sunday of each year.

The earliest notable rock-and-roll performance at Red Rocks was by The Beatles on August 26, 1964, the only concert not sold out during their US-tour. When Ringo Starr returned to Red Rocks with his All-Starr Band on June 28, 2000, he asked if anyone in the crowd had been at the Beatles concert thirty-six years earlier. On August 26, 2004, the East-Coast-based Beatles-tribute band "1964" was flown to Denver to re-enact the Beatles concert held at the site exactly forty years earlier. The unique setting has led to the venue's becoming a favorite for many performers: Jimi Hendrix played at Red Rocks on September 1, 1968, along with Vanilla Fudge and Soft Machine. Diana Ross & the Supremes performed there on August 14, 1969.

An incident during a performance by Jethro Tull on June 10, 1971, led to a five-year ban of rock concerts at Red Rocks. Approximately 1,000 people without tickets arrived at the sold-out show. Denver police directed the overflow, non-paying crowd to an area behind the theater, where they could hear the music but not see the band. The situation seemed satisfactory until some of the people without tickets attempted to enter the amphitheatre by charging at, and breaking through, the police line. Some of those without tickets began lobbing rocks at the police, and the police responded by discharging tear gas at the gate-crashers. The wind carried the tear gas over the hill, into the paying crowd and onto the stage. Following the "Riot at Red Rocks,"  Denver Mayor William H. McNichols Jr. banned rock concerts from the amphitheatre. For the next five years, shows at Red Rocks were limited to softer acts, such as John Denver, Sonny & Cher, The Carpenters, Pat Boone, Seals & Crofts, and Carole King. The ban on rock and roll was finally lifted through legal action taken by Denver concert promoter Barry Fey, who tried to book the band America at the venue in 1975. After being denied a permit by the city, Fey took the city to court, and the court ruled that the city had acted "arbitrarily and capricious[ly]" in banning rock concerts at Red Rocks. Starting in the summer of 1976, the rock bands were once again welcomed at the venue. Jethro Tull played Red Rocks again on June 7, 1988, August 12, 2008, and June 8, 2011.

The Blues Brothers performed at the amphitheatre on July 15, 1980.

On June 5, 1983, U2 performed during their War Tour, in front of only 4,400 in very inclement weather. The venue had been sold out, but the crowd size was affected by the weather, with attendees believing the show would be canceled. The show was not canceled, however, because the band could not get their money back for the outlay on filming crews and equipment set to work with them for the performance. Those who braved the weather and showed up were told, personally by Bono, who came to the parking lot and into the crowd more than once, to ignore their seat assignments, and to move as forward as they wished to make the house seem full, since the show was being filmed for what became the group's concert film U2 Live at Red Rocks: Under a Blood Red Sky.  The music video for "Sunday Bloody Sunday", shown in heavy rotation on MTV, was also the fruit of the filming effort. Some songs from the show appear on the group's 1983 live album Under a Blood Red Sky.

Depeche Mode performed at the amphitheatre four times: the first time was July 1, 1986.  The second and third were on July 11 and 12, 1990, during their World Violation Tour. The fourth was on August 27, 2009, during their Tour of the Universe, in front of a crowd of 8,679 people. The show was recorded for the group's live albums project Recording the Universe.

Red Rocks was one of the favored venues for The Grateful Dead and the venue has become a traditional stop for many subsequent jam bands. Widespread Panic holds the record for the most sold-out performances at Red Rocks, with 66 as of June 2022. Blues Traveler has played the venue every Fourth of July since 1993, except 1999 when lead singer and harmonica player John Popper was unable to play due to heart surgery. Phish were banned from performing at Red Rocks after they played four concerts there in August 1996. Fans of the band who showed up to the concerts without tickets were accused of starting a riot outside the amphitheater on the second night, and the nearby town of Morrison was unprepared to accommodate the size of the band's following. Phish was not invited to perform at Red Rocks again until July 2009.

Geddy Lee of the rock band Rush said, "It's an amazing location." One of the most stunning concert venues in the United States... or anywhere. "I would hazard a guess that it's one of the most beautiful places in the world." Rush played Red Rocks on their R30 30th Anniversary, Snakes and Arrows, and Time Machine tours.

In 2013, electronic musician Bassnectar reportedly cracked and broke several pieces of the amphitheater walls, with bass. In 2015, he broke the city's sound ordinance laws, which caused the city and county of Denver to begin implementing rules on sound pressure levels and event end times so that the venue can’t exceed 125 decibels at the low-frequency levels of 25–80 hertz for one-minute averages after midnight on weekdays and 1 a.m. on weekends and holidays. These laws have effectively banned the Bassnectar music project from returning to the venue.

Colorado musicians who have performed at Red Rocks include John Denver in 1973, Judy Collins in 1973, Big Head Todd and the Monsters in 1994, Earth, Wind & Fire (some members are from Denver) in 2002, The Fray in 2006, DeVotchKa in 2008, 3OH!3 in 2012, Pretty Lights in 2012, OneRepublic in 2013, The Lumineers in 2013, and Strawberry Runners in 2016. As of 2017, Colorado band String Cheese Incident has played at Red Rocks 35 times.

During the 2020 pandemic, Red Rocks hosted the Colorado Symphony Strings, which played sold-out Acoustic on the Rocks shows in July and August, following social-distancing guidelines.

In September 2020, virtual shows were streamed live. Despite Denver Arts & Venues announcing the closure of all its venues (including Red Rocks) in September, in-person shows did occur. Other events included drive-in movies for mainstream films and the Denver Film Festival's red carpet movies.

In 2021, Red Rocks Amphitheatre was named the top-grossing and most-attended concert venue of any size, anywhere in the world.

On August 9 and 10, 2022, South Park creators Trey Parker and Matt Stone held a live concert alongside rock bands Primus, Ween, and Rush at Red Rocks Amphitheatre, commemorating South Parks 25th anniversary. Besides a few original songs from the supporting bands, the concert mainly consisted of Parker and Stone performing music from the series.

Notable recordings 

Red Rocks has been a popular venue for live recordings, particularly videos, due to the visual uniqueness of the setting.  During the 1970s and 1980s, local folk-rocker John Denver recorded several world-televised concerts at Red Rocks. U2's 1983 concert video, Live at Red Rocks: Under a Blood Red Sky, became a bestselling long-form concert video and the performance of "Sunday Bloody Sunday" was played frequently on MTV. Fleetwood Mac singer Stevie Nicks released a 60-minute-long DVD of her August 1986 concert at the amphitheatre, towards the end of her Rock a Little tour.  In 1992, The Moody Blues performed live for the first time with a symphony orchestra for the PBS special "A Night at Red Rocks with the Colorado Symphony Orchestra". The concert also was released on CD and DVD, along with a companion DVD, The Other Side of Red Rocks, which documented show rehearsals and preparation, as well as concert excerpts.

Other Red Rocks material on CD and DVD includes Dave Matthews Band's albums Live at Red Rocks 8.15.95 and the CD/DVD Weekend on the Rocks, which is a compilation of the band's four-night run in 2005, their last performances at the venue. Also recorded are The Samples live album Live in Colorado, John Tesh's Live at Red Rocks and Worship at Red Rocks, the Incubus DVD Alive at Red Rocks, Blues Traveler's Live on the Rocks album, Steve Martin's comedy album A Wild and Crazy Guy, The Moody Blues's A Night at Red Rocks with the Colorado Symphony Orchestra, and Boukman Eksperyans' album "Live At Red Rocks". Widespread Panic's DVD The Earth Will ,Swallow You features a 15-minute segment on Red Rocks.

The Grateful Dead performed at Red Rocks 20 times. 7/7/78 and 7/8/78 have been released in their entirety on July 1978: The Complete Recordings and Red Rocks: 7/8/78.

The live Neil Young album Road Rock Vol. 1 and its accompanying DVD, Red Rocks Live, were filmed and recorded at Red Rocks in 2000 during the "Silver and Gold" tour. Local Colorado band Big Head Todd and the Monsters released a DVD and live album of a 1995 performance in 2003, capturing what has become a local annual early season tradition. In 2009, they followed the original recording with a two-CD/1DVD set from their June 2008 performance.

A two-volume 2003 album, Carved In Stone – Volume 1, featuring live recordings of 10 artists including R.E.M., Ben Harper, Coldplay, The Allman Brothers Band, and Phish, with proceeds benefiting “Preserve The Rocks Fund,” a donation-driven reserve dedicated to the rehabilitation and preservation of the historic Red Rocks Amphitheatre. The follow up live compilation CD, Carved In Stone – Volume 2, Live at Red Rocks Amphitheatre was released in October 2007. Erik Dyce, Trevor Pryce of Outlook Music Co., and Jeff Giarraputo of Factory Labs were the executive producers, making it the first venue to issue a CD and the first commercial release of these live tunes.

Phish frontman Trey Anastasio included excerpts from his 2005 performance at Red Rocks on the DVD that accompanied his album Shine. Country musician Gary Allan filmed the music video for his song "Watching Airplanes" during a live, sold-out concert at Red Rocks in August 2007. A portion of British rock band Oasis's rockumentary film Lord Don't Slow Me Down was filmed at Red Rocks. A Perfect Circle also included one live video recording on the CD-DVD AMotion. Insane Clown Posse played with Twiztid, Blaze Ya Dead Homie, Boondox, the Axe Murder Boyz, Grave Plott, The ROC, and Motown Rage in May 2008 at Red Rocks at perform the 'first annual' Hatchet Attacks Super Show, for which they released a video later that year.

Depeche Mode recorded their show at the amphitheatre on August 29, 2009, for their live album project, Recording the Universe.

Country singer Kenny Chesney included a live version of "You and Tequila", a duet with Grace Potter, on his album Welcome to the Fishbowl. The recording has a segment with audience participation singing the chorus "You and Tequila make me crazy, run like poison in my blood, one more night could kill me baby, one is one too many, one more is never enough".

A Perfect Circle recorded the DVD portion of their A Perfect Circle Live: Featuring Stone and Echo box set on August 2, 2011. Also included in the box set is a CD of the audio from the show.

On August 29, 2012, Mumford & Sons recorded their live performance of their first single, "I Will Wait" from their new CD Babel at the amphitheatre. The performance was released on September 9, 2012, as the band's official video for the song. The band released a full-length DVD of their show at Red Rocks, recorded on August 28 and 29, 2012, entitled The Road To Red Rocks.

On September 1, 2014, OneRepublic, a band hailing from Colorado Springs, announced they would be heading back to Red Rocks for a special performance to close out the North American leg of their Native Summer Tour. While performing the song "I Lived" they recorded the band, the audience, and one of their fans (Bryan Warnecke) for the "I Lived" music video. The video also featured several aerial views of the venue during the day as well as during the concert itself. This performance of the song was done to help spread awareness for cystic fibrosis and to share Bryan's journey with the disease. The music video was released on September 25, 2014.

On June 10, 2015 Barenaked Ladies performed at Red Rocks on their Last Summer on Earth 2015 tour. The performance was aired on AXS TV, then later released on May 20, 2016, as a live album titled BNL Rocks Red Rocks and in 2017 the English hard rock supergroup Bad Company.

Opeth released a live DVD and Blu-ray of their May 11, 2017, performance at Red Rocks on November 2, 2018. Gojira performed the same night and released the full concert, titled Live At Red Rocks, on YouTube on May 20, 2020.

The American pop-punk band Nofx released a live recording of their full 18-minute song "The Decline (EP)" featuring Baz's orchestra in a 2019 performance at the venue. Comedian Bill Burr filmed a comedy special at Red Rocks in September 2021.

In film and television 
In 1987, former Colorado Senator Gary Hart announced his campaign for president with a press conference at Red Rocks.

Part of the 1990 film The Adventures of Ford Fairlane was filmed at Red Rocks.  Opening sequences feature the fictional rock band "Black Plague" playing at Red Rocks Amphitheatre where lead singer Bobby Black (played by Vince Neil) makes a grand entrance hanging from the rock face of the landmark red rocks above the crowd swooping on stage via zipline.

The place was featured in The Amazing Race 9, which aired in 2006. The place was used as the show's Starting Line and also the Finish Line.

Colorado Music Hall of Fame 

In June 2015, the Colorado Music Hall of Fame opened its doors in the Trading Post at Red Rocks.

Gallery

See also 
 List of contemporary amphitheatres
 Red Rocks Park
 Mishawaka Amphitheatre, outdoor concert venue outside of Fort Collins, Colorado
 Live at Red Rocks: Under a Blood Red Sky (1983) – a live video by U2
 Live at Red Rocks 8.15.95 (1997) – a live album by Dave Matthews Band
 Weekend on the Rocks (2005) – a live album/DVD by Dave Matthews Band
 Night Visions Live (2014) – a live album/video by Imagine Dragons

References 
Red Rocks Park and Amphitheatre History and Geology. (n.d.). Retrieved November 16, 2017

External links 

 

Amphitheaters in the United States
Landmarks in Colorado
Music of Denver
Music venues in Colorado
Fountain Formation
Rock formations of Colorado
Tourist attractions in Jefferson County, Colorado
Civilian Conservation Corps in Colorado
Buildings and structures in Jefferson County, Colorado
1906 establishments in Colorado
Cultural infrastructure completed in 1906